The women's 100 metre butterfly event at the 2008 Olympic Games took place on 9–11 August at the Beijing National Aquatics Center in Beijing, China.

Top favorite Lisbeth Trickett powered past the entire field to earn Australia's second straight gold in the event. She posted a lifetime best of 56.73, just 0.12 of a second outside the world record set by Dutch swimmer Inge de Bruijn at the 2000 Summer Olympics in Sydney. U.S. swimmer Christine Magnuson took home the silver in 57.10, while Trickett's teammate Jessicah Schipper picked up the bronze in 57.25, handing an entire medal haul for the Aussies in the pool.

China's Zhou Yafei finished fourth with a time of 57.84, while Tao Li made a historic milestone for Singapore as she became the nation's first ever swimmer to reach an Olympic final, earning a fifth spot in 57.99. Meanwhile, Great Britain's Jemma Lowe (58.06), Brazil's Gabriella Silva (58.10), and Netherlands' Inge Dekker (58.54) closed out the field.

Records
Prior to this competition, the existing world and Olympic records were as follows.

Results

Heats

Semifinals

Semifinal 1

Semifinal 2

Final

References

External links
Official Olympic Report

Women's butterfly 100 metre
Women's 100 metre butterfly
2008 in women's swimming
Women's events at the 2008 Summer Olympics